Ségny, also written Segny, is a commune in the Ain department in eastern France.

Ségny is situated in the east of the department, in a district of the Lake Geneva / River Rhône basin known as the Pays de Gex. It lies on the important RN 5 trunk road from Paris to Geneva and is just five minutes by road from Geneva Cointrin International Airport.

Ségny became a member of the Pays de Gex Community of Communes on 1 January 1996. The commune is bordered by Cessy to the north, Versonnex to the east, Prévessin-Moëns and Ornex to the south, and Échenevex and Chevry to the west.

Population

See also
Communes of the Ain department

References

Communes of Ain
Ain communes articles needing translation from French Wikipedia